Daniel George John Tarkanian (born December 18, 1961) is an American attorney, businessman and perennial candidate for elective office. A Republican, he has mounted unsuccessful campaigns for the Nevada Senate (2004), Nevada Secretary of State (2006), the United States Senate (2010, 2016 and 2018),and the United States House of Representatives (2012, 2016, 2018 and 2022). In 2020, Tarkanian finally won his first office, being elected to the Douglas County Commission.

Tarkanian filed to run for the U.S. Senate against incumbent Dean Heller in the 2018 Republican primary, but later withdrew to run for the United States House of Representatives in Nevada's 3rd congressional district, winning the nomination and then losing the general election to Democrat Susie Lee. In 2020, Tarkanian was elected as a member of the County Commission for Douglas County, population 46,997. He defeated incumbent Commissioner Dave Nelson in the Republican primary election and was unopposed in the general election.

Early life, education, and legal career
Tarkanian was born in Redlands, California, the third of four children. He is the son of Jerry Tarkanian, a prominent University of Nevada Las Vegas (UNLV) basketball coach, and Lois Tarkanian (née Huter), a Las Vegas City Councilwoman, educator of children with disabilities, administrator, and a co-founder for California's first private school for the deaf.

Tarkanian grew up in three different California cities, (Riverside, Pasadena, and Huntington Beach) as his father progressed in his professional career.

The Tarkanian family moved to Nevada in 1973 when Danny was 12. He attended Hyde Park Junior High School in Las Vegas and later the Bishop Gorman High School. He achieved honors in all four years. At Bishop Gorman High School, he played both basketball and football, and both sports teams went into the playoffs and won state championships. In basketball, he played point guard. In football, he played quarterback and was named All-Conference and All-State at his position twice.

After graduating from high school, he spent one year at Dixie College, playing basketball one season for the Rebels, where his team went to the regional playoffs. He was named the school's Male Freshman of the Year.

Tarkanian then transferred to UNLV, where he was coached by his father. He played 3 seasons, 1981–1984, for the UNLV Runnin' Rebels basketball. In his sophomore year, his team won 24 straight games and was ranked number one nationally. At UNLV, Tarkanian was twice named First-Team Academic All-American by the CoSIDA.

He was drafted by the San Antonio Spurs in the 1984 NBA Draft in Round 8, but did not make the team.

Following graduation, Tarkanian received his J.D. from the University of San Diego School of Law.

Tarkanian passed the Nevada Bar Exam and practiced law for eight years, four as proprietor of his own firm.

In 1995, Jerry Tarkanian became the head coach for the Fresno State Bulldogs basketball team at Fresno State, where Danny joined his father as an assistant coach. The team qualified for the post-season every year during Tarkanian's tenure.

Tarkanian moved back to Las Vegas following his father's retirement in 2002. He started a real estate investment business and he co-founded the Tarkanian Basketball Academy.

Political campaigns

2004 Nevada State Senate election
On May 4, 2004, Tarkanian filed to run in Nevada's 11th Senate district (map) against incumbent Michael A. Schneider. Schneider defeated Tarkanian in the general election.

Following the election, Tarkanian successfully sued his Democratic opponent for libel and defamation. During the campaign, Schneider made various accusations against Tarkanian, including accusing him of involvement with the creation of illegal telemarketing companies designed to defraud the elderly. The case went to trial on July 27, 2009. Schneider stood by statements he made in a 2004 debate with Tarkanian and in campaign ads and fliers accusing Tarkanian. Former assistant U.S. Attorney Leif Reid, son of Nevada U.S. Senator Harry Reid, testified that Tarkanian was not part of the investigation into the telemarketing companies. On July 31, 2009, a Clark County District Court jury ruled in Tarkanian's favor and awarded him $50,000 in damages. On August 3, 2009, Schneider agreed to pay a $150,000 settlement in the case.

2006 Secretary of State election
In December 2005, Tarkanian announced his second bid for public office, this time a statewide election for Nevada Secretary of State.  He defeated Brian Scroggins in the Republican primary and faced Democratic nominee Ross Miller, the son of former Nevada governor Bob Miller in the general election. Miller defeated Tarkanian in the general election.

2010 U.S. Senate election

In 2009, Tarkanian announced that he would run against Democratic U.S. Senator Harry Reid. Before other candidates entered the primary, Tarkanian was the front-runner for the Republican nomination. Former Nevada Republican Chairwoman Sue Lowden and Former Assemblywoman Sharron Angle entered the primary field shortly after Tarkanian's announcement and quickly overtook him in the polls. Angle won the nomination with Tarkanian finishing third in the field.  Angle ultimately lost the general election to Reid.

2012 U.S. House election

In January 2012, he announced he would run in the newly created Nevada's 4th congressional district. The district includes most of northern Clark County, as well as all or part of the rural counties of Esmeralda, Lincoln, Lyon, Mineral, Nye and White Pine. 46% of the district were registered Democrats, higher than the statewide average of 43%. Registered Republicans were 33% of the district, while they made up 35% statewide.

In June 2012, Tarkanian won the Republican primary with 32% of the vote, defeating eight other candidates. The most notable of these was State Senator Barbara Cegavske, who won the endorsements of the party establishment. Tarkanian faced Democratic State Senate majority leader Steven Horsford in the general election. He lost to Horsford, 50–42%. Although Tarkanian won the rural counties in the district by margins of better than 2-to-1, it was not enough to overcome a 28,800-vote deficit in the district's share of Clark County, home to four-fifths of the district's vote.

2014 Nevada System of Higher Education Regent election
Tarkanian filed to run for NSHE Regent on March 14, 2014 and withdrew on March 25, 2014 citing that he did not want to oppose a family friend, attorney Trevor Hayes.

2016 U.S. House election

Tarkanian ran to represent Nevada's 3rd congressional district in the 2016 election. He won the Republican primary in June 2016, and faced Democrat Jacky Rosen in the November 2016 general election. Rosen won with 47% of the vote to Tarkanian's 46%. Tarkanian sued Rosen after the election for defamation and the case is currently pending.

2018 U.S. Senate election

On August 8, 2017, Tarkanian announced on Fox News that he would run against incumbent Republican Nevada Senator Dean Heller in the 2018 primary. Tarkanian promised firmer support for President Donald Trump. He also gained the support of Steve Bannon, the executive chairman for Breitbart News. In October 2017, Tarkanian was photographed with brothel owner Dennis Hof at a county fair.

On February 1, 2018, in a meeting between Republican National Committee members and Donald Trump, Trump said that he would travel to Nevada to support Heller, who was doing well in the polls, in the Republican primary against Tarkanian. On March 16, 2018, hours before the filing deadline and at the request of President Trump, Tarkanian announced that he would be withdrawing from the Senate race and would instead run for Nevada's 3rd congressional district.

2018 U.S. House election

Tarkanian had seven times as much campaign funding as any of his primary opponents as of mid-April 2018. He won the Republican primary on June 12, 2018, with 44.1% of the vote. He faced Democrat Susie Lee in the general election and lost 52–43%.

2020 Douglas County Commission election
Tarkanian ran against incumbent Republican Dave Nelson for District 1 of the Douglas County Commission, which includes the town of Gardnerville. He defeated Nelson in the June 17 primary by 17 votes. While Nelson indicated he would seek a recount, he ultimately decided against it. Tarkanian ran unopposed in the general election as no Democrat filed, making his primary victory tantamount to election.

2022 U.S. House election 
Tarkanian was a candidate for Nevada's 2nd congressional district in the 2022 election, unsuccessfully challenging Republican incumbent Mark Amodei. As a candidate, he has spoken in favor of banning taxpayer funding from going to Planned Parenthood and breaking up Big Tech companies through antitrust enforcement.

Legal issues
In June 2012, a federal court issued a $17 million judgment against Tarkanian and his family in a California real estate deal gone bad.

In February 2018, the campaign co-chair for Dean Heller filed a complaint with the Federal Election Commission regarding a $40,000 loan that went from Tarkanian's charity basketball organization to his campaign during his 2012 candidacy.

Personal life
In October 2001, Tarkanian married Amy Hanson. The couple lived in Las Vegas until 2019 when they moved to Gardnerville. They have four children. In 2011, Amy Tarkanian was elected chairwoman of the Nevada Republican Party, served about eight months, and resigned in February 2012 during her husband's primary campaign.

Electoral history

References

External links

 Danny Tarkanian for Congress official campaign website
 
 

1961 births
21st-century American businesspeople
21st-century American politicians
American men's basketball players
American people of Armenian descent
American real estate businesspeople
Armenian Apostolic Christians
Basketball players from California
Bishop Gorman High School alumni
Candidates in the 2004 United States elections
Candidates in the 2006 United States elections
Candidates in the 2010 United States elections
Candidates in the 2012 United States elections
Candidates in the 2016 United States elections
Candidates in the 2018 United States Senate elections
Candidates in the 2022 United States House of Representatives elections
Utah Tech Trailblazers men's basketball players
Fresno State Bulldogs men's basketball coaches
Junior college men's basketball players in the United States
Living people
Nevada lawyers
Nevada Republicans
Politicians from Gardnerville, Nevada
People from Redlands, California
Politicians from Las Vegas
San Antonio Spurs draft picks
University of San Diego School of Law alumni
UNLV Runnin' Rebels basketball players
Conservatism in the United States